The Salvadoran Patriotic Fraternity (abbreviated FPS) is a Salvadoran political party. Its leader is Óscar Morales Lemus.

Electoral history

Presidential elections

Legislative Assembly elections

Municipal elections

References 

Political parties in El Salvador
Political parties established in 1985
1985 establishments in El Salvador